Beluru may refer to:

Belaru, later name for the ship Empire Passmore
 Bēlūru or Belur, Karnatka, India
Beluru District, Sarawak, Malaysia